George Elwell Spencer (July 7, 1926 – September 10, 2014) was an American pitcher in Major League Baseball. A right-hander, he was primarily a relief pitcher for the New York Giants and the Detroit Tigers.

A graduate of Bexley High School and Ohio State University, where he played quarterback on the OSU varsity football team, Spencer was a key member of the 1951 Giants' pitching staff, leading the club in saves and winning ten of 14 decisions, including a key August start over the front-running Brooklyn Dodgers. The Giants would famously overcome a 13-game, mid-August deficit to tie Brooklyn on the season's final day, then defeated the Dodgers for the National League pennant on Bobby Thomson's historic Game 3 home run.

References

External links

Retrosheet profile
Venezuelan Professional Baseball League statistics
Obituary

1926 births
2014 deaths
Baseball players from Columbus, Ohio
Charleston Senators players
Columbus Jets players
Denver Bears players
Detroit Tigers players
Detroit Tigers scouts
Indianapolis Indians players
Jacksonville Tars players
Jersey City Giants players
Knoxville Smokies players
Leones del Caracas players
Major League Baseball pitchers
Minneapolis Millers (baseball) players
Navegantes del Magallanes players
American expatriate baseball players in Venezuela
New York Giants (NL) players
Omaha Cardinals players
Salt Lake City Bees players
Seattle Rainiers players
Statesville Tigers players
Toronto Maple Leafs (International League) players